Crassispira sulcata is an extinct species of sea snail, a marine gastropod mollusk in the family Pseudomelatomidae, the turrids and allies. Fossils have been found in Eocene strata in the Paris Basin, France.

Subspecies
 † Crassispira (Tripia) sulcata adriani (Dollfus, 1899) (synonyms:Pleurotoma dollfusi de Boury non Vincent, 1878, Pleurotoma adriani Dollfus, 1899;  Drillia (Tripia) adriani (Dollfus, 1899),  Crassispira (Tripia) quoniamensis (Boussac in Périer, 1995)  
 † Crassispira (Tripia) sulcata costaria (G.P. Deshayes, 1834) (synonyms: 	Drillia (Crassispira) costaria (Lamarck, 1804); Drillia (Tripia) costaria (Lamarck, 1804))

References

 Cossmann (M.) & Pissarro (G.), 1913 Iconographie complète des coquilles fossiles de l'Éocène des environs de Paris, t. 2, p. pl. 46-65
 Le Renard (J.) & Pacaud (J.-M.), 1995 Révision des Mollusques paléogènes du Bassin de Paris. 2 - Liste des références primaires des espèces. Cossmanniana, t. 3, vol. 3, p. 65-132

External links
 MNHN, Paris: † Crassispira (Tripia) sulcata adriani 
 Pacaud J.M. & Le Renard J. (1995). Révision des Mollusques paléogènes du Bassin de Paris. IV- Liste systématique actualisée. Cossmanniana. 3(4): 151-187

sulcata
Gastropods described in 1804